Maria Dmitriyevna Aksenova (born February, 23) is a Russian public figure, media personality, encyclopedist, and businessperson.

According to are books and famous magazines, Aksenova is publisher, poetess and sportswoman. As of 31 October 2001, she controlled 55% ($16.5 million) of the Publishing House's revenue.

M. Aksenova – winner of the Russian President's Award in the field of education (2001); author of educational TV projects, an accredited MVP level investor of Moscow Seed Fund, academician of the Russian Academy of Natural Sciences.

Personal life 

Born and raised in Moscow, USSR, Maria Aksenova graduated from the Moscow school with a Silver medal. She graduated from the MSU Faculty of Mechanics and Mathematics, where she received a first-class degree. Maria studied Executive MBA at RANEPA.

On March 7, 2001, Maria was speaker at the meeting of the President of the Russian Federation V.V. Putin with outstanding business women of Russia.

She studied English and Spanish. Hobby: ikebana, travelling (32 countries), rescue diver, old daggers, ethnic jewellery, Qigong.

Family 

Her paternal great-grandfather,  was a Russian Silver Age poet of the 20th century. Great-grandfather's father, Ivan Evdóshenko was a nobleman and managed some gymnasiums in The Russian Empire.

Her maternal great-grandparents, Alexei Plotnokov and Praskovya Danilova-Plotnikova were among of the leaders of the Revolution Movement in Podmoskovye, Riga and Minusinsk.

Avanta+ Publishing House 

At the age of twenty, Maria came up with the idea of creating an encyclopedia for children, comparable to the Great Soviet Encyclopedia. As a student at Moscow State University, she became a co-founder, then the chairman board of directors of the Avanta+, a leading producer of children’s encyclopedias:
 "Encyclopedia for Children Avanta+" (many of them best sellers at top Russian stores); 
 "Modern Encyclopedia"; 
 "The most beautiful and famous" album book series etc.

Encyclopedia for Children Avanta+ is recommended by the Ministry of General Education of the Russian Federation and the UNESCO Academic department by International Center of Educational Systems (ICES), and is also recognized as a national project. 

Nine employees of the Avanta+ Publishing House and Encyclopedia for Children's authors have become laureates of the Russian President's Prize in the field of education. The winners of the Award were: Maria Aksenova, Viktor Volodin, Andrey Gryaznov, Elena Dukelskaya, Lyudmila Petranovskaya, Georgy Khramov, ValerySanyuk.

Publishing House team's mission statement: "We present in an accessible form the sum of all knowledge".

The Printing Pioneer Fund 

Since 2007, Maria Aksenova has been the chairman of the board of The Printing Pioneer Fund. Fund activities:

 Educational TV programs;
 Acceleration, exportand other programs for impact-startups;
 International cultural and educational events (ex: International Wiki-Conference 2021).

The Fund became the initiator and creator of the intersectoral impact cluster in The Moscow Innovation Cluster.

Entrepreneurial and investment activity 

M. D. Aksenova is a co-founder and investor in a number of projects:
 Sweets Empire Café, Marocana restaurant chain (Moroccan cuisine), Niyama Japanese restaurant chain (franchise, food production, IT, delivery);
 , Avanta+ Publishing House;
 Innovation project: EdTech, HealthTech, etc.

As an investor, she has more than five exits. There are four startup impact in the current portfolio.

Organizations and business communities 

Maria Aksenova was and is a member of organizations and business communities:
 Business Women of Russia Confederation;
 New Moscow Entrepreneurs Club;
 a number of Boards of Trustees;
 Russian Supreme Council of Ecology;
 National Independent director Registry (as an Independent director since 2002);
 AngelsDeck Investors Club (since 2020).

Research work 

Maria Aksenova is a researcher of the cultural and religious traditions of various countries, the author of a number of publications and speeches. In 1998, Obshchaya Gazeta published two articles on the death of Carlos Castaneda: Viktor Pelevin's "The Last Joke of a Warrior" and Maria Aksenova's "Who Left This World?".

Maria Aksenova tells about unknown details of Classics writers' fates and their works in her book – "Do We Know Everything About the Classics of World Literature?".

Poetry 

A book combining a collection of poems "Cascade Splashes" of the Silver Age poet, Peter Evdóshenko, and a collection of poems "Blues of Emptiness" of his great-granddaughter Maria Aksenova was published in 2007.

Do We Know Russian? 

In 2008-2012, Maria Aksenova and her colleagues conducted work on the study of the history of Russian words, names, adages. The work resulted in a cycle of television programs, events and books:
 168 episodes of "Do Russians know Russian?" TV show;
 Three-Volume Edition "Do We Know Russian?" (3rd volume:  and 2nd combined edition). In 2012, the 1st and 2nd volumes was shortlisted for the Enlightener Prize by the Dynasty Foundation;
 meetings with readers and schoolboys.

On TV, Films and Radio 

Author's and acting works:
 2003 – "The Taming of the Success" talk show ( TV channel)
 2006 – "Outlook beyond the MKAD" on  radio station;
 2008-2010 – a series of documentaries "A Novel in Stone" ("World masterpieces of love");
 2008-2010 – poetic art videos based on the poems of Russian poets;
 2008-2012 – 168 episodes of "Do Russians know Russian?" TV show.

Selected filmography

Sport 

 1980s – finalist of the national championship, 4-time champion of Moscow Russian Draughts.
 2000s – PADI Rescue Diver.

Awards and honors 

 Laureate of the Russian President's Prize in the field of education for the development of a scientific and methodological concept for the presentation of educational materials and the creation on its basis of the fundamental book series the Encyclopedia for Children (2001).
 Winner of Manager of the Year award in the nomination "Publishing Business" (2001, Kommersant Publishing House).
 Among the Top 100 businessperson of the rating "Who manages the finances of Russia" in 2001 – the first and only woman.

References

Works cited

External links 
  by Maria Aksenova
 

Russian encyclopedists
Russian women in business
Russian women poets
Writers from Moscow
21st-century Russian women writers
Moscow State University alumni
Russian television presenters
20th-century Russian poets
21st-century Russian poets
Russian publishers (people)
Russian activists
Soviet draughts players
Russian draughts players
Players of Russian draughts
Russian science writers
Russian women company founders
Sportspeople from Moscow
Year of birth missing (living people)
Living people
Businesspeople from Moscow